Alrutheus Ambush Taylor (1893–1954) was a historian from Washington D.C. He was a specialist in the history of blacks and segregation, especially during the Reconstruction Era. The Crisis cited him as a "painstaking scholar and authority on Negro history". An African-American, he taught at Tuskegee University in Tuskegee, Alabama, at the West Virginia Collegiate Institute in West Virginia, and at Fisk University in Nashville, Tennessee. Following a grant from the Laura Spelman Rockefeller Memorial Fund, Taylor began researching the role of African Americans in the South during Reconstruction. He authored The Negro in South Carolina During the Reconstruction in 1924, The Negro in the Reconstruction of Virginia in 1926, and The Negro in Tennessee, 1865-1880 in 1941.

References

1893 births
1955 deaths
20th-century African-American writers
20th-century American historians
20th-century American male writers
Academics from Washington, D.C.
African-American historians
American male non-fiction writers
Harvard University alumni
Historians of African Americans
Historians of the Reconstruction Era
Tuskegee University faculty
University of Michigan alumni
West Virginia State University faculty
Writers from Washington, D.C.
African-American male writers